William or Bill Gardner may refer to:

Sport
Bill Gardner (baseball) (1868–1948), American baseball player
Bill Gardner (footballer) (1893–1973), English professional footballer
Bill Gardner (ice hockey) (born 1960), retired ice hockey player
Billy Gardner (born 1927), retired American baseball player
Billy Gardner, Jr. (born 1966), American baseball manager and son of Billy Gardner (born 1927)
William Jennings Gardner (1884–1965), American football player and member of Eliot Ness's "Untouchables"
Bill Gardner (football hooligan) (born 1954), English football supporter, former football hooligan and co-author of books on football hooliganism

Military
William Linnæus Gardner (1771–1835), Indian officer
William M. Gardner (1824–1901), Confederate States Army brigadier general
William Gardner (sailor) (1832–?), American Civil War sailor and Medal of Honor recipient
William Gardner (VC) (1821–1897), Scottish recipient of the Victoria Cross

Others
William Gardner (Australian settler) (1802–1860), pioneer and historian
William Gardner (coin designer) (1914–2000), English coin designer, engraver, calligrapher and writer
William Gardner (former slave) (1759–unknown), freedman who had been a slave of U.S. President James Madison
William Gardner (surgeon) (1846–1897), practised in South Australia and Victoria
William E. Gardner Jr. (1939–1991), president of Savannah State College
William Biscombe Gardner (1847–1919), English painter and wood-engraver
William James Gardner (1825–1874), British missionary in Jamaica
Bill Gardner (author), American author
Bill Gardner (politician) (born 1948), secretary of state for New Hampshire
Willie Gardner, Scottish rock musician
William Gardner, pseudonym of Peter Hope
William Gardner (Massachusetts judge) (1827–1888), justice of the Massachusetts Supreme Judicial Court

See also
William Gardner Hale (1849–1928), American classical scholar
William Gardner Smith (1927–1974), African-American novelist and journalist
William Gardiner (disambiguation)
William Gairdner (disambiguation)